Feldman's Department Store, currently known as the Teal Professional Building, is a historic commercial building in Haleyville, Winston County, Alabama.  It was added to the National Register of Historic Places on August 12, 2009.

History
Feldman's is a two-story brick building that was completed in 1911 for John Dodd.  It was the first brick building, and is the oldest surviving commercial building, in Haleyville. The building was purchased by Moses Feldman in 1914.  He and his wife, Fanny Royal, were both Eastern European Jewish immigrants to the United States.  They purchased Dodd's building in order to open a department store in the rapidly expanding town. The store occupied the entire first floor, with assorted professional and business offices housed on the second. The Feldmans' son Abe joined the business during the 1930s.  The department store operated into the late 1990s, closing upon the death of the Feldmans' youngest son David.

References

National Register of Historic Places in Winston County, Alabama
Buildings designated early commercial in the National Register of Historic Places
Commercial buildings completed in 1911
1911 establishments in Alabama